The 2021–22 Loyola Ramblers men's basketball team represented Loyola University Chicago during the 2021–22 NCAA Division I men's basketball season. The Ramblers, led by first-year head coach Drew Valentine, played their home games at the Joseph J. Gentile Arena in Chicago, Illinois as members of the Missouri Valley Conference. They finished the regular season 25–7, 13–5 in MVC play to finish in a three-way tie for second place. As the No. 4 seed in the MVC tournament, they defeated Bradley, Northern Iowa, and Drake to win the MVC tournament for the second consecutive season. As a result, they received the conference's automatic bid to the NCAA tournament as the No. 10 seed, where they lost in the first round to Ohio State.

On November 16, 2021, Loyola announced that the season would be the last season for the team in the MVC as they joined the Atlantic 10 Conference in July 2022.

Previous season
In a season limited due to the ongoing COVID-19 pandemic, the Ramblers finished the 2020–21 season 26–5, 16–2 in MVC play to win the regular season championship. They defeated Southern Illinois, Illinois State, and Drake to win the MVC tournament championship. As a result, they received the conference's automatic bid to the NCAA tournament as a No. 8 seed in the Midwest region. There they defeated No. 9-seeded Georgia Tech and upset No. 1-seeded Illinois to advance to the Sweet Sixteen. In the Sweet Sixteen, they lost to Oregon State.

On April 3, 2021, head coach Porter Moser left Loyola to accept the head coaching position at Oklahoma. A few days later, the school announced that assistant coach Drew Valentine would take over as the Ramblers' head coach.

Offseason

Coaching changes
On April 20, Valentine announced the hiring of assistant coaches Amorrow Morgan, Sean Dwyer, and Patrick Wallace. Former Oakland associate head coach Dan Hipsher was named special assistant to the head coach.

Departures
Due to COVID-19 disruptions, the NCAA did not count the 2020–21 season against the eligibility of any basketball player, meaning that all seniors in that season could choose to return for 2021–22.

Incoming transfers

2021 recruiting class

Roster

Schedule and results
After losing several game to cancellations and postponements due to COVID-19, Loyola and San Francisco agreed to play a game on January 6, 2022, on the campus of Salt Lake Community College.
|-
!colspan=9 style=| Exhibition

|-
!colspan=9 style=| Regular season

|-
!colspan=12 style=| MVC tournament

|-
!colspan=12 style=| NCAA tournament

Rankings

*AP does not release post-NCAA Tournament rankings.^Coaches did not release a Week 1 poll.

References

Loyola
Loyola Ramblers men's basketball seasons
Loyola Ramblers men
2020 in Illinois
2020s in Chicago
Loyola